Milk thistle may refer to several plants:

 Lactuca serriola
 Silybum marianum
 Various species of Sonchus, including:
 Sonchus asper, rough milk thistle
 Sonchus arvensis, field milk thistle
 Sonchus oleraceus, common milk thistle

See also
 Milkweed (disambiguation)